Lorenzo Muscoso  (Catania, 30 September) is an Italian director, author and journalist.

Biography
Muscoso graduated in 2011 on the major of Cinema, Critic and Multimedia Production in DAMS of the University of Roma 3, with a bachelor thesis on Paolo Sorrentino and the Rossellini Audiovisual Institute.

He made his directorial debut in 2008, participating in a contest promoted by Negramaro and Jovanotti for the production of the video "Safari Remix" at which was attributed a social connotation.In 2009 he wrote and directed "Emozioni senza barriere" (Emotions without boundaries), a short film that relates to the disability and the emotions, project for which Muscoso received an award for the social journalism, published also from the Corporate Bracco as a contribution for the cultural development on the social problems. The film received the Special Mention at the Sicilian Miami Fest and the Oscar for the best short film at the Festival del nema dello scettroo.

In 2010, in collaboration with the actor Enrico Lo Verso and the musician Gabriele Denaro, he created the work Sensibilità Sonore, dedicated to topics such as marginalization, poverty and childhood. The following year, he produced the documentary "Il rimorso" (the remorse), a video that narrates violence against the women. The project was being projected every year during national conferences in various Italian cities and received an award for the Social Communication. The journal Fatto Quotidiano considered it as "a virtuous example that denounces the wrong". It was previewed at the Camera dei deputati della regione Lazio (Chamber of Deputies of the Region of Lazio) and introduced the conference "Lui per Lei - un ponte fra Napoli e New York" at the city Partenopea and at the municipality of Fiumincino by the iniziative of the Assesorato alle politiche sociali (Department of social policies) as well as the event "Io non ci sto più" (I am non there anymore) dedicated to the memory Eligia Ardita, a victim of a femicide act.In 2013 he directed the documentary "Streghe a Pachino: Un caso giornalistico irrisolto" (Witches at Pachino: An unsolved journalistic case), recovering after 50 years, a mysterious fact initially narrated by Beppe Ferrara in 1963 that burst a war between the media, the politics and the omertà. The same year he films three special documentaries about Mario Sesti, Sergio Donati and the musician Mauro Di Domenico. He carried out interviews with personalities from the show business, created web projects, such as the ObamaStay, a project that promotes and supports the election of the American president, which received the appreciation from the Woman for Obama and from the Electionpaper, concerning the Italian elections reported by the press agencies Agi and RAI.He wrote for the Sindacato Nazionale di Critica (National Syndicate of Italian Film Critics). He contributed in the distribution of the film "Midway" and with the production company Arbash for the film "Blaise''. He was responsible for the communication for the New World of the Cirque du Soleil in one of their stops in Sicily, for the direction of the Euro-Mediterranean award that took place at the Campidoglio in Rome and the artistic coordination of the Western Fest of Orvieto and the Indie Media Fest. From 2014 he is devoted actively for the promotion of the Patrimonio Verghiano, redeveloping the historical Cunziria, the original film location of the famous Cavalleria Rusticana, directed by Franco Zeffirelli and inspiration scenery of the homonymous novel of the writer Giovanni Verga. Muscoso eventually turned the ancient village into a stage denominating it Teatro Cunziria.

In 2014 in collaboration with the American Naval air station of Sigonella, he came up with the socio-cultural iniziative project "Marines meet Verga", an operation for the rural development of the Cunziria, constructing a fence inside the area. The action was repeated in 2016 and 2017 with the newer operation "Marines revisit Verga" that completes the internal fencing. Those projects attracted the interest of the United States Department of Defense which attributed him two recognition awards for his iniziatives.
He wrote, directed and adapted in the location various theatrical operas such as "Il Duello", based on the famous duel between Alfio e Turiddu receiving great success from the public and the press, the "Presepe Verghiano" and the itinerant opera "Romazo Verghiano'".

In 2016 he assumes the artistic direction of the Festival Verghiano, on the occasion of the Verghiane, the historical manifestations that began in 1967 by the director Alfredo Mazzone, producing ten days of theatrical operas that placed a Vizzini and Catania. For the occasion he realized a 10-day theatrical, film and cultural event, some of which were the opera "La lupa",  performed in the location where the film adaptation by Gavriele Lavia was staged, the 4th edition of the Romanzo Verghiano and Cultura Verghiana. For the occasion he also directed the operas Jeli il Pastore, I Malavoglia, La Roba e Storia di una Capinera. Moreover, in collaboration with the Superintendence of cultural heritage of Catania, realizes the theatrical performances ''Frammenti rusticani in scena'' at the Palazzo Vaccarini.

In April 2017 he promoted the educational project Cultura Verghiana, where more than 2000 students from middle, senior high schools and universities participated, including US High Schools and Erasmus scholars. The initiative receives the appreciation of the Minister of Education Valeria Fedeli and is supported by the European Parliament with the praise of the President Antonio Tajani and Petra kammerevert, President of the European Commission of Culture.

The Festival Verghiano 2017 had as a ''godmother'' the actress Maria Grazia Cucinotta who receives a Career Award. The festival was attended by about 1,500 people. The director Lorenzo Muscoso staged Jeli il pastore , in a version inspired by Amlets' madness and the drama of La Lupa. The event concludes with the Verga Film Festival, an event that celebrates the real and social cinema with many guests of the world of the entertainment.

On September of the same year, he launched the initiative in various cities within the world of the "Infiorata Rusticana", floral compositions that narrate the myth of Cavalleria Rusticana and other novels of the writer Giovanni Verga as long as the photographic exhibition ''Frammenti Rusticani'', initiatives dedicated to Giovanni Verga and promoted by the director on the occasion of the nomination of Sicily as a Capital of Culture for the year 2018.
In April 2018 he realizes the 5th Edition of the Romanzo Verghiano at the historic residence La Verghiana proposing a show that combines the musical poems of the storyteller, Sicilian folk sounds, theatrical performances and the audiovisual projection of the famous rustic duel. In September of the same year he directed the 4° Festival Verghiano presented at Casa Museo Verga by the archaeologist Sebastiano Tusa, Councilor of the Sicily Region, who promoted the event in a national and European dimension and chose it to represent the Cultural Heritage on the occasion of the Festival of Mediterranean in Paestum. In October he brings,  for the first time, Novel of Verga inside the Enna Luigi Bodenza, Prison District where he gives acting lessons to the various inmates bringing them to the debut on the scene. He concludes the year by curating the III° Verga Film Festival, where he awards the Musician Gianni Bella, author of the opera Capinera performed at the Bellini Theater in Catania. In November 2018 he moved to Matera, Capital of Culture, where he organized the Matera Rosa, an event for the national day against violence women and the subsequent Tra Favole e Realtà. In April 2019, in Matera, he announces the V ° edition of the Festival Verghiano among the stones with the intervention of the actress Mariagrazia Cucinotta, official Testimonial of the Event that meets the students of the high school and universities. On May 23, on the occasion of the national day on legality he writes and directs the "Capitani Coraggiosi” event dedicated to the memory of Judges Giovanni Falcone and Paolo Borsellino and with a tribute to Peppino Impastato. On 14 June he continued his productivity bringing to Matera the Tramonto ai Sassi, an event that combines poetry, theater and southern folk sounds, staging, for the first time, a fragment Verghiano "Jeli il Pastore". On In August the 5th Edition of the Verghiano Festival, he create a connection between Sicily - Puglia and Matera 2019. The performances of "La Lupa" in Ragusa Ibla and in the Castle of Donnafugata records a sold out and consecrate artistic excellency on the national territory. In October, in Gravina in Puglia, he realizes the Film Festival on the Bridge and stages Jeli, il Pastore, achieving great success. Later he was nominated as Artistic Director of Matera Hollywood, a film event in connection with the United States and other film organizations around the world and where in collaboration with Netflix, awards in Matera "The Irishman" directed by Martin Scorsese as the best Movie in the Capital of European Culture 2019. On the occasion of the Oscar Academy Awards 2020, he launches the Joker Day project, in order to match the award to Joaquin Phoenix with a day dedicated to social reflection on different themes such as diversity, inequality and marginalization. At Easter he launches the release of his film "Cavalleria Rusticana" directly online. The proceeds are donated to charity to help families, hospitals and associations against the emergency of the coronavirus. In June 2020, he promotes Italy Drone Film Festival, an event dedicated to the world of aircraft and in the same period launches the Virtual Festival, an event with 14 artistic disciplines with over 100 personalities of Entertainment, including 7 Oscars Awards, Artists, Musicians and Olympic champions. 

Despite Covid, he successfully realizes the Festival Verghiano 2020 at the Donnafugata Castle, staging all the Verga stories for the first time in a single Novel. In November he launched the social event "Canone Inverso", an artistic manifesto against violence against women, an event that involved students of the high schools of Milan, the photographer Tiziana Luxardo. On December 30 he launches online the film "Presepe Verghiano" a cinematographic transposition of the Nativity within the realist context. On 26 January it launches the Sicily Hollywood Film Festival in cooperation with the United States, dedicated to Sicilian and American cinema. Since March 2021 it has been part of the national audiovisual training project for schools for the Ministry of Cultural Heritage. On May 23, for the day of legality, he launches "Capaci 17:58 Capitani Coraggiosi" involving artists and personalities, Antonio Vassallo, Letizia Battaglia, Joe Tacopina, John Badalamenti, Joe Pistone, Leoluca Orlando, Pasquale Scimeca, Marco Amenta and Veronica D'Agostino, Domenico Centamore. In September 2021, he directed the 7th Edition of the Verghiano Festival staging the Mastro Don Gesualdo in a new adaptation focused on the controversial relationship with the family. In December of the same year he launched the "Verga 100" event dedicated to the centenary of the writer Giovanni Verga and awards the Premio Verga to Placido Domingo which included in the opening ceremony, which saw the participation of Miguel Gotor, the Deputy Director of Tgr Rai, Roberto Gueli, and the Pietro Mascagni Committee. On January 27, 2022, on the occasion of the Commemoration, he publishes the official book of the Centenary, announces the Postage Stamp dedicated to the Novelist made in collaboration with the Ministry of Economic Development, and during the day, organizes a series of initiatives that see the participation of Pasquale Scimeca , Giuseppe Castiglia, Salvo La Rosa and the broadcasting of Jeli il Pastore, Cavalleria Rusticana and La Lupa. In April, in collaboration with the Feltrinelli Foundation and the Municipality of Milan, it promotes a meeting involving 250 students. In June he produces the documentary "Cunziria" which tells the recovery phases of the Borgo and the film "Legends Rusticane" which receives 9 awards, also winning in Ukraine, the United States and Japan. In August he successfully directs Don Gesualdo in Modica and Ragusa, and for the first time, in Catania at the ancient Monastery Eremo Sant'Anna, scenery of Zeffirelli, becomes the stage for Verga's operas. In October he directed "Don Gesualdo" in Palermo at the Spasimo Cathedral and the following month in Caltanissetta, he staged Rosso Malpelo at the Gessolungo mine on the occasion of the carusi massacre, and "Don Gesualdo at the Teatro Margherita. In December, he announces the Duchess of Leyra, Sequel to Don Gesualdo and sets the Fifth Edition of the Verghiano Nativity at the Eremo Sant'Anna Monastery, registering an important success.

Cinema

Direction, Screenplay, Production
 Safari Remix (Contest - 2008)
 Emozioni senza barriere (2009)
 Il Rimorso (2011)
 Prospettive Filosofiche nella critica cinematografica (2013)
 I Riflessi dell’Anima Sonora (2013)
 C’era una volta il Western (2013)
 Streghe a Pachino (2013)
 Cavalleria Rusticana (2020)
 La Lupa (2020)
 Jeli, Il Pastore (2020)
 Il Poeta di Campagna (2021)
 Presepe Verghiano (2020 - 2022)
 Leggende Rusticane (2022)

Actor
 La banda dei supereroi (2014)

Theater

Direction, Screenplay, Production
 Il Duello (2014)
 Romanzo Verghiano (2014 - 2018 - 2020)
 Presepe Verghiano (2014 - 2017)
 La lupa (2016-2019)
 La Roba (In 1st Romanzo Verghiano) (2015)
 Nedda (In 1st Romanzo Verghiano) (2015)
 Rosso Malpelo (ln 1st Romanzo Verghiano) (2015 - 2022)
 Jeli il Pastore (ln 3rd and 4th Romanzo Verghiano) (2016)
 I Malavoglia (In 3rd Romanzo Verghiano) (2016)
 Jeli il Pastore - The drama (2017 - 2019)
 I racconti dell'anima - The drama (2018 - 2019)
 Io sono Impastato - Monologue(2019)
 Mastro Don Gesualdo (2021 - 2022)
 La Sicilia Ribelle (2022)
 Cavalleria Rusticana Lyric Version (2022)
 Capinera (2022)
 Padron Ntoni (2022)

Artistic direction and coordination
 Premio Euromediterraneo Roma (2011)
 Catania Film Festival (2012)
 Western Festival (2012)
 Indie Media Fest (2012)
 Sapori Rusticani (2016-2017)
 Verga Film Fest  (2016-2022)
 Festival Verghiano  (2014-2020)
 Matera Rosa  (2018)
 Matera : Tra Favole e Verità  (2018)
 Matera : Capitani Coraggiosi (Tribute to Falcone and Borsellino)  (2019-2021)
 Matera : Tramonto ai Sassi (2019)
 Matera : Festival del Cinema sul Ponte (2019)
 Matera : Matera Hollywood International Film Festival (2019 - 2020)
 Online : Drone Film Festival (2020)
 Online : Virtual Festival (2020)
 Sicily : Sicily Hollywood Film Festival (2021)
 Verga 100 : National Centenary Event (2022)

Book
 Il Primo Sorrentino (2020)
 Wild Movie West (2020)
 Le Verghiane (2020)
 Cavalleria Rusticana (2020)
 La Lupa (2020)
 Jeli il Pastore (2020)
 1917 Il Film (2021)
 Verga 100 (2022)

Conferences
 Camera dei Deputati Lazio “25 Novembre”" (Rome, 2013)
 Comune di Napoli “Him for She” (Napoli, 2014)
 Cinema Politeama Moderno “Io non ci Sto”  (Pachino, 2015)
 Convegno contro il Femminicidio” (Aci S.Antonio, 2016)
 Istituto Tecnico Leonardo Da Vinci (Milazzo, 2017)
 La Sapienza University, Department of Neuropsychiatry  (Rome, 2017)
 Cafè Culture (Sliema, Malta, 2017)
 Palazzo Lanfranchi “Matera Rosa” (Matera, 2018)
 University Unibas "Festival Verghiano (Matera, 2019)
 Wroclaw University "Verga Project (Poland, Breslavia 2020)

Multimedia Social Project
 Obamastay (Usa, 2009)
 Election Paper (Italy, 2013)
 Expo Wall (Italy, 2015)
 Freedom Women (World, 2016)
 Joker Day (World, 2020)
 Canone Inverso (Italy, 2020)
 Gerzia Project (Italy, 2021)

Awards
 2008 : Fondazione Sodalitas - National award for the social journalism for the documentary Emozioni senza barriere
 2009 : Festival Dello Stretto - Corto Oscar for the documentary  Emozioni senza barriere
 2010 : Festival S.Giovanni La Punta - Award for the communication of the project Rimorso
 2014 : Comando Generale U.S Marines - Encomium from the commander of the U.S Marines for the project Marines meet Verga
 2014 : Aci Galatea - Award 49° Aci Galatea
 2016 : Ministero della Difesa Usa, Sigonella - Award for the project and the direction of the operation Marines Revisit Verga
 2017 : Award to Lorenzo Muscoso for the operation Marines Rusticani
 2022 : Award for Best Director (Premio Cinema Messina)
 2022 : Award to Leggende Rusticane for the Best Short (Tamizhagam International Film Festival)
 2022 : Award to Leggende Rusticane for the Best Short (Indie online film award)
 2022 : Award to Leggende Rusticane for the Best Short (Golden Horse film festival)
 2022 : Award to Leggende Rusticane for the Best Short (Diamond Bell film festival)
 2022 : Award to Leggende Rusticane for the Best Director (Halicarnassus Film Festival)
 2022 : Award to Leggende Rusticane for the Best Director (Athvikvaruni International Film Festival)
 2022 : Award to Leggende Rusticane for the Best Short (Indie for you Festival)
 2022 : Award to Leggende Rusticane for the Best Director (Halicarnassus Film Festival)
 2022 : Award to Leggende Rusticane for the Best Short  (Makizhmithran International Film Festival)
 2022 : Award to Leggende Rusticane for the Best Director (Makizhmithran International Film Festival)
 2022 : Award to Leggende Rusticane for the Best Short  (World Film Carnival - Singapore)
 2022 : Award to Leggende Rusticane for the Best Short   (Indo Singapore International Film Festival)
 2022 : Award to Leggende Rusticane for the Best Director (Indo Singapore International Film Festival)
 2022 : Award to Leggende Rusticane for the Best International Short (National Melbourne Benalla Short Film Festival )
 2022 : Award to Leggende Rusticane for the Best Film (Rome Outkast Independent Film Award)
 2022 : Award to Leggende Rusticane for the Best Film (Istanbul Film Festival)
 2022 : Award to Leggende Rusticane for the Best Film (Jakarta Film Festival)
 2022 : Award to Leggende Rusticane for the Best Film (Mabig Film Festival Augsburg)
 2022 : Award to Leggende Rusticane for the Best Film (Monza Film Fest)
 2022 : Award to Leggende Rusticane for the Best Film (Green Island International Film Festival)
 2022 : Award to Leggende Rusticane for the Best Film (Navy international film festival)
 2022 : Award to Leggende Rusticane for the Best Film (Saudi Arabia Independent Film Festival)
 2023 : Award to Leggende Rusticane for the Best Film (Focus Las Vegas Film Festival) 
 2023 : Award to Leggende Rusticane for the Best Film (International Tourism Film Festival Africa)

References

External links
 Lorenzo Muscoso (Official Web Site)
  (Magazine Ufficiale)
 
 Cinecriticaweb - Scheda -
 Riconoscimento a Lorenzo Muscoso dalla Base di Sigonella

Italian film directors
Italian male writers
Writers from Catania
Living people
Journalists from Catania
Film people from Catania
Year of birth missing (living people)